Brunflo is a locality situated in Östersund Municipality, Jämtland County, Sweden with 3,890 inhabitants in 2010. It is situated some 15 km south-east of Östersund.

Sports
The following sports clubs are located in Brunflo:

 Brunflo FK
 Brunflo IF

References 

Populated lakeshore places in Sweden
Populated places in Östersund Municipality
Jämtland